Robert "Bob" Schwartz is a healthcare and political figure who resides in Nashville, Tennessee. He was an unsuccessful candidate in 2010 for the Republican nomination for U.S. Congress in the 5th Congressional District of Tennessee, consisting of Davidson County (metropolitan Nashville), western Wilson County and southeastern Cheatham County.

Early years and education
Robert Risdon Schwartz was born on September 17, 1950 in Detroit, Michigan.  His father was Arthur Schwartz, a chemical engineer.  Martin, his great grandfather, was a Jewish emigre who came to America from Hungary in 1891.  His mother Mary Margaret (née Moore) was a homemaker.  Her family emigrated from Wales to America in 1732. Schwartz has one brother, Arthur Schwartz, Jr.  Both sons were raised in the Episcopal Church following their mother's religious tradition.  Schwartz was in college during the Viet Nam War, but received a high lottery number and was not called up to serve. Both sides of his family have strong military tradition.  His grandfather, Frederick Wolf Schwartz, served in the U.S. Army in World War I.  His father saw duty in the U.S. Navy in the Pacific theater in World War II.  His brother is retired from the U.S. Air Force.  Several family members from his mother's side fought for the colonies in the Revolutionary War. 
 
Schwartz began his education in public schools in Holland, Michigan before his family returned to the Detroit area in the 1960s.  He attended public schools in Grosse Pointe before matriculating at the University of Michigan in 1968.  Working his way through college, Schwartz majored in anthropology and was a rare conservative elected to his college's Government Council in the radical sixties.  After graduation in 1972, he returned to Detroit where he worked as a UAW member stacking parts in a Chrysler warehouse.   Having become interested in health care organization and administration at Michigan, Schwartz entered Yale University in 1974 in a Master of Public Health program focusing on health services administration.  He served as President of his class and graduated in 1976.

Professional career
Most of Schwartz' career was spent in healthcare at employers including Blue Cross Blue Shield of Michigan, the Detroit Medical Center and SmithKline.  Schwartz moved to Nashville, Tennessee in the mid 1990s and worked in regional operations in the employee wellness market. He currently works with investors as an Advisor in the Nashville office of Engel & Voelkers, the German real estate giant.

Activities and interests
Schwartz was a competitive oarsman for fifteen years.  Based at the Detroit Boat Club, the oldest boat club in continuous operation in the USA, he competed in fours and, later, in the lightweight single.  He holds bronze and silver medals from the U.S. Rowing Championships and won four gold medals in lightweight events at Canadian Henley Regattas. 
 
Schwartz interrupted his healthcare career to pursue a music career in the late 1990s.  Adopting his mother's maiden name, he performed as Bobby Moore and developed a following in Berlin, Germany.  He released one CD titled "Off the Grill."  He became a voting member of the Country Music Association (CMA) in 1994.   A handful of Moore's songs were recorded by independent artists.  "Three Weeks to Go," a song co-written with Hank "Cowboy from Japan" Sasaki, was named Story Song of the Year by the Traditional Country Music Association (TCMA) in 2014.  TCMA founder Bob Everhart described the song in an on-line review as:  "An astonishing rendition of what country music has always been...."

Politics
Schwartz' public career in politics stopped for many years after graduate school.  In 2008, however, he became involved in the Presidential race supporting the Republican ticket of John McCain and Sarah Palin.  He founded and chaired a grassroots organization called Music Row 4 McCain that generated networking and media attention for McCain/Palin.  Largely as a result, he was one of 100 Americans to be named to the Platform Committee to the 2008 Republican National Convention in Minneapolis.  As a freshman on the Platform Committee, Schwartz added "home schooling" as a legitimate alternative to public school education to the Platform.  He also drafted language that was approved on a voice vote of the full Committee emphasizing the importance of prevention and early detection in health policy.   Schwartz was also elected and served as a Delegate-at-Large from Tennessee to the 2008 Convention.
 
After the loss of the McCain/Palin ticket, Schwartz returned to local grassroots activities.  He was elected one of three Regional Directors of the Davidson County Republican Party.  He also served as Membership Chair for the group and, in that role, worked to bring trainers from Leadership Institute, the Arlington-based conservative think tank where he had previously studied, to two training workshops in Nashville.
 
Schwartz began investigating a run against long-time incumbent Democrat Jim Cooper in Tennessee's Fifth Congressional District in 2009. Cooper, the wealthy son of a former Tennessee Governor, announced his intention to run for re-election to a ninth term in Congress.  Schwartz entered a crowded Republican field and focused his campaign on healthcare reform and legislative reforms in Congress.  He lost his bid in the August primary finishing a distant fifth place.  In 2012, he served as Executive Director of Newt Gingrich's statewide volunteer effort.  Largely as a result, he was a Delegate to the 2012 Republican National Convention in Tampa garnering more votes in Tennessee's Fifth Congressional District than Gingrich or eventual party nominee Mitt Romney.

References

1950 births
Living people
Tennessee Republicans
University of Michigan College of Literature, Science, and the Arts alumni
Yale School of Public Health alumni